The 2019 Munster Senior Hurling Championship was the 2019 installment of the annual Munster Senior Hurling Championship organised by Munster GAA.

Cork were the defending champions, but finished third in the group. Limerick defeated Tipperary in the final.

Teams
The Munster championship was contested by five of the six counties from the Irish province of Munster. The exception was Kerry, traditionally the province's weakest at hurling (but strongest in football).

Personnel and colours

Group table

{| class="wikitable" 
!width=20|
!width=150 style="text-align:left;"|Team
!width=20|
!width=20|
!width=20|
!width=20|
!width=35|
!width=50|
!width=20|
!width=20|
|- style="background:#ccffcc"
|1||align=left| Tipperary ||4||4||0||0||8-101||1-80||42||8
|- style="background:#ccffcc"
|2||align=left| Limerick ||4||2||0||2||4-92||2-71||27||4
|- style="background:#FFFFE0"
|3||align=left| Cork ||4||2||0||2||6-98||7-87||8||4
|-
|4||align=left| Clare ||4||2||0||2||3-73||6-89||-25||4
|- 
|5||align=left| Waterford ||4||0||0||4||2-67||7-104||-52||0
|}
Waterford did not need to play a relegation-playoff to avoid relegation to the Joe McDonagh Cup for 2020, because the winners of the 2019 Joe McDonagh Cup were from Leinster (Laois).

Group matches

Round 1

Round 2

Round 3

Round 4

Round 5

Final

See also
 2019 All-Ireland Senior Hurling Championship
 2019 Leinster Senior Hurling Championship
 2019 Joe McDonagh Cup

References

Munster
Munster Senior Hurling Championship